Lazarus is a 1902 Australian religious film from the Limelight Department of The Salvation Army in Australia.

Plot
Raising of Lazarus, raising of the son of the widow of Nain, the raising of Jairus' daughter, and the exorcism of the Syrophoenician woman's daughter.

References

External links
Lazarus at National Film and Sound Archive

1902 films
Australian silent short films
Australian black-and-white films
Limelight Department films